Stepan Sergeyevich Ganzey (born May 30, 1981) is a Russian former swimmer, who specialized in freestyle events. He is a multiple-time Russian champion and a two-time medalist at the European Junior Championships (1999). He is a member of Khanty-Mansiyskiy AO, and is coached and trained by Boris Vasilenko.

Ganzey qualified for the men's 4×200 m freestyle relay, as a member of the Russian team, at the 2004 Summer Olympics in Athens. Teaming with Maksim Kuznetsov, Yevgeniy Natsvin, and Alexei Zatsepine in the second heat, Ganzey swam the third leg, and recorded a split of 1:50.18. The Russians finished the race in sixth place and eleventh overall with a final time of 7:23.97.

References

External links
Profile – Info Sport Russia 
Coaching Profile – CSP-UGRA 

1981 births
Living people
Russian male swimmers
Olympic swimmers of Russia
Swimmers at the 2004 Summer Olympics
Russian male freestyle swimmers
Sportspeople from Vladivostok
20th-century Russian people
21st-century Russian people